Charles Henry Grosvenor (September 20, 1833 – October 30, 1917) was a multiple-term U.S. Representative from Ohio, as well as a brigade commander in the Union Army during the American Civil War.

Biography
Grosvenor was born in Pomfret, Connecticut. He was the uncle of Charles Grosvenor Bond. In 1838, Grosvenor moved with his parents to southeastern Ohio, where he attended school in Athens County. He later taught school before studying law. He was admitted to the bar in 1857 and practiced in Athens.

During the Civil War, Grosvenor served in the 18th Ohio Infantry and was promoted through the ranks to colonel. He led his regiment at the Battle of Chickamauga in 1863, and was a brigade commander in the division of Charles Cruft at the Battle of Nashville in December 1864. At the close of the war, Grosvenor was brevetted as a colonel in the Regular Army. He was mustered out of the volunteers on October 9, 1865. On January 13, 1866, President Andrew Johnson nominated Grosvenor for appointment to the grade of brevet brigadier general of volunteers, to rank from March 13, 1865, and the United States Senate confirmed the appointment on March 12, 1866.

Following the war, Grosvenor held diverse township and village offices. He served as a member of the State house of representatives from 1874–1878 and served as Speaker of the House for two years. He served as member of the board of trustees of the Ohio Soldiers' and Sailors' Orphans' Home in Xenia from April 1880 until 1888, and president of the board for five years.

Presidential elector for Grant/Wilson in 1872.
Presidential elector for Garfield/Arthur in 1880.

He served as delegate to the Republican National Convention in 1896 and 1900. Grosvenor was elected as a Republican to the Forty-ninth, Fiftieth, and Fifty-first Congresses (March 4, 1885 – March 3, 1891). He was an unsuccessful candidate for renomination in 1890.

Grosvenor was elected to the Fifty-third and to the six succeeding Congresses (March 4, 1893 – March 3, 1907).
He served as chairman of the Committee on Expenditures in the Department of the Treasury (Fifty-fourth Congress), Committee on Mines and Mining (Fifty-fifth Congress), Committee on Merchant Marine and Fisheries (Fifty-sixth through Fifty-ninth Congresses). He was an unsuccessful candidate for renomination in 1906.

He resumed the practice of law in Athens. The combat veteran was appointed as chairman of the Chickamauga and Chattanooga National Park Commission and served from 1910 until his death in Athens on October 30, 1917. He was interred in Union Street Cemetery.

Grosvenor married Samantha Stewart of Athens County, December 1, 1858. She died in 1866, leaving a daughter. He married Louise A. Currier, also of Athens County, May 21, 1867. She had two daughters.

See also

List of American Civil War brevet generals (Union)

Notes

References

 Retrieved on 2008-08-13

External links

1904 Photo

1833 births
1917 deaths
People from Athens, Ohio
Ohio lawyers
People of Ohio in the American Civil War
Union Army colonels
Union Army generals
Speakers of the Ohio House of Representatives
1872 United States presidential electors
1880 United States presidential electors
19th-century American politicians
19th-century American lawyers
Republican Party members of the United States House of Representatives from Ohio